Eugene Delmar (September 12, 1841, New York – February 22, 1909, New York), was one of the leading United States chess masters of the 19th century and the four-time New York State champion in 1890, 1891, 1895 and 1897. He  won a match against Robert Henry Barnes with only a single draw (+7 –0 =1).

References

External links

1841 births
1909 deaths
American chess players
19th-century chess players